List of actors appearing in Hellraiser and its sequels.

Doug Bradley as Pinhead / Captain Elliott Spencer
Kenneth Cranham as Dr. Philip Channard / Doctor Cenobite
Terry Farrell as Joan "Joey" Summerskill
Bruce Ramsay as Phillip 'ToyMaker' L'Merchant / John Merchant / Dr. Paul Merchant
Lance Henriksen as The Host
William Hope as Kyle MacRae / Zombified Kyle / Dead Kyle
Ashley Laurence as Kirsty Cotton (double)
Deborah Joel as Skinless Julia / Skinless Julia on Pillar
Paula Marshall as Terri / Dreamer Cenobite / 'Skinless' Sandy
Aimée Leigh as Sandy / 'Skinless' Sandy (screams)
Adam Scott as Jacques
Louis Mustillo as Sharpe
Kim Myers as Bobbi Merchant
Courtland Mead as Jack Merchant
Brent Bolthouse as CeedDee 'CD' the DJ
Eric Willhelm as CD Cenobite
James Remar as Dr. Paul Gregory/The Engineer
Andrew Robinson as Larry Cotton / Disguised Frank Cotton
Craig Sheffer as Detective Joseph Thorne
Angus MacInnes as Detective Ronson
Nicholas Turturro as Detective Tony Nanonon
William S. Taylor as Detective Mike Lange
Michael Rogers as Detective Givens
Valentina Vargas as Peseant Girl / Angelique / Angelique Cenobite
Marc Warren as Joey
Dean Winters as Trevor Gooden
Michael Polish as Siamese Twin Cenobite 1
Mark Polish as Siamese Twin Cenobite 2
Kari Wührer as Amy Klein
Nicholas Vince as Chatterer / Chatterer II
Sean Chapman as Frank Cotton / Frank the Monster (voice) / Skinless Frank (voice)
Oliver Smith as Frank the Monster / Skinless Frank / Mr. Browning/Skinless Frank
Frank Baker as Derlict (Puzzle Guardian)
Oliver Parker as Delivery Man 1 / Moving Man 2
 Andrew Magnus "Andy" as de L'Vaux -Gambler 2/Clown-Cenobite 2 (scenes deleted)
Dave Atkins as Delivery Man 2
Grace Kirby as Female Cenobite
Paul Perri as Edwards/'Skinless' Parker
Christine Harnos as Rimmer
Tom Dugan as Chamberlain
Simon Bamford as Butterball
Barbie Wilde as Female Cenobite II / Sister Nikoletta (human form)
Pete Atkins as Richard "Rick" Bloodskull "The Barman" / Barbie Cenobite
Pat Skipper as Commander Carducci
Kenneth Tobey as Hologram-Priest (scenes deleted)
Kevin Bernhardt as J.P. Monroe / Pistonhead Cenobite
James Hong as Asian Dealer (The Box Seller)(uncredited/unconfirmed)
Bill Weston as Unnamed Customer (uncredited/unconfirmed)
Clive Barker as (uncredited/unconfirmed)
Jim Dowdall as Unnamed Man (uncredited/unconfirmed)
Joe Gilmore as (dubbed voice)(unconfirmed)
Tony Message
Jolene Anderson as Chatterer / Female Cenobite
Stephan Smith Collins as Pinhead
Jay Gillespie as Nico / Skinless Nico / Pseudo-Pinhead
Fred Tatasciore as Pinhead (voice) / Faceless Steven
Katheryn Winnick as Chelsea

Actors
Hellraiser